Last Hippie Standing (2001) is a 45-minute documentary by the German filmmaker Marcus Robbin about Goa, India. The film compares the 1960s and 1970s hippie era with the situation in 2000.
The film has no commentary and consists of documentation of the ongoing party culture in Goa, as well as private and previously unreleased Super 8 footage from the 1960s and 1970s in Goa, filmed by Cleo Odzer. This material is the only existing contemporary film document of the hippie era in Goa. Furthermore, interviews with hippie veterans like Goa Gil, locals, and the former chief minister of Goa, Francisco Sardinha, describe the clashes that occur between the party culture and Indian conservatism.  The last part of the documentary is shot at the Berlin Love Parade, where the protagonists reflect on their own spiritual development and the changes that have occurred since the hippie movement's advent.

Since 2004, it has been distributed by Nowonmedia (Japan).

References

External links 
 Official Website
 

Hippie films
Expatriates in India
Tourism in Goa
Goa trance music
Goan society
German documentary films
Films shot in Goa
Films shot in Germany
Documentary films about drugs
2001 films
Documentary films about India
2001 documentary films
Films set in Goa
2000s English-language films
2000s German films